Chikkaladinni is a village in Belgaum district in the southern state of Karnataka, India. According to the 2001 Census of India, it had a population of about 1889 persons in 336 and more households.

References

Villages in Belagavi district